Cybook is the brand of the French company Bookeen for its line of ebook readers.

The following models have been released in this line:
Cybook Gen1
Cybook Gen3
Cybook Opus
Cybook Orizon
Cybook Odyssey
Cybook Odyssey HD FrontLight
Cybook Muse
Cybook Muse Frontlight

Dedicated ebook devices